Mute (also known as Click II in some countries) is a 2018 neo-noir science fiction film directed by Duncan Jones, who co-wrote the script with Michael Robert Johnson. A follow-up to his 2009 film Moon, it stars Alexander Skarsgård, Paul Rudd, Justin Theroux, Robert Sheehan, Noel Clarke, Florence Kasumba, and Dominic Monaghan, revolving around a mute bartender (Skarsgård) searching for the love of his life (Seyneb Saleh) who has mysteriously disappeared. A third instalment, a graphic novel called Madi: Once Upon A Time In The Future, was released in 2020.

It was released on Netflix on 23 February 2018 and received negative reviews, with praise for the visuals but criticism for its pacing, plot, and mishandled subject material; it drew unfavorable comparisons to Blade Runner from many critics.

Plot

A childhood accident leaves Leo mute and his devout Amish mother refuses surgery. As an adult in 2035, he works as a bartender at a Berlin strip club owned by Maksim and dates cocktail waitress Naadirah. She confides in her friend Luba that she has not told Leo about her past or her desperate need for money.

After Stuart, a rowdy customer, sexually harasses Naadirah, Leo assaults him. Naadirah talks Leo down by telling him that she needs to keep her job.

Naadirah shows up at Leo's apartment and attempts to tell him about something important. Leo shows her an elaborate bed he has been carving as a present for her. Naadirah is overcome with emotion and they have sex. Elsewhere, Maksim's mobsters meet two American surgeons, Cactus Bill and Duck, who run a black-market clinic. Bill desperately wants to leave Berlin and has pressed Maksim to provide forged documents for him and his young daughter, Josie. Duck, however, enjoys living in Berlin and runs a side business where he installs implants and performs cybernetic surgery.

Stuart returns to the strip club and taunts Leo, leading to a fight and Maksim firing Leo. When he's unable to contact Naadirah, Leo asks Luba for help, but Luba refuses. An anonymous text message leads Leo to a black-market bazaar run by Stuart. Bill and Josie are there, and Bill takes Josie away as Stuart confronts Leo. Suddenly remembering that Naadirah wrote an address on his notepad a while back, Leo leaves the bazaar after using charcoal to read the imprint.

Naadirah's address leads Leo to Oswald. When Leo expresses interest in a picture of Naadirah, Oswald assumes Leo works for Maksim's underling Nicky Simsek, who is skimming money from Maksim's prostitutes. Leo meets with Simsek, who is babysitting Josie. Leo befriends Josie and leaves the money from Oswald and a note incriminating Simsek in front of Maksim's henchmen.

After tracking down Naadirah's address, Leo discovers Luba instead. Luba admits that he and Naadirah have been working as prostitutes to earn the money she so desperately needs. Luba also expresses anger at Naadirah having loved Leo instead of himself. Tracking down Naadirah's mother, Leo learns Naadirah is Josie's mother and realizes Bill is responsible for Naadirah's disappearance.

After Bill and Duck torture Simsek on Maksim's orders, Bill discovers pictures of naked children on Duck's computer. Bill threatens to break Duck's arms if he ever touches a child, but Bill becomes elated when Maksim reports he has the forged documents ready. Bill takes Duck out on the town in celebration, offering his house to Duck. It is during this time that Duck casually reveals that he was the one who had been anonymously texting Leo, as a way to vent his frustrations with Bill. A security guard stops them for a casual theft, and Bill threatens to kill the guard. When Duck intervenes, Bill strikes him. Upset by this treatment, Duck texts Bill's destination to Leo. Leo takes a support beam from the bed he made, uses it to beat up Maksim and his henchmen, and then takes Bill's forged documents.

In Bill's house, Leo finds a badly wounded Simsek and Naadirah's asphyxiated corpse in a bag, murdered by Bill. After killing Simsek, Bill attacks Leo, only to have Leo impale Bill on his own knife. Duck arrives at Bill's house, refuses to take Bill to a hospital, and instead, turns the surveillance camera installed in Josie's room towards Bill's face, so he will see what Duck will do with Josie, taunting him with the idea of his plans of the future molestation of his daughter.

Duck knocks out Leo and implants an electrolarynx so he can hear Leo apologize for killing Bill. When Leo refuses, Duck takes him to the bridge in the one photo Leo has of Naadirah. Leo still refuses to apologize, takes a deep breath and throws them both into the water. Duck drowns and Leo shouts a warning to Josie not to get close to the bridge's edge. Both of them safe and sound, Leo tells Josie he will take her to her maternal grandmother. After some time has passed a healed Leo sits with Josie in a restaurant, both drawing pictures.

Cast

 Alexander Skarsgård as Leo, a man left mute from a childhood accident
 Levi Eisenblätter as young Leo
 Paul Rudd as Cactus Bill, an American surgeon
 Justin Theroux as Duck, Cactus' partner and best friend
 Seyneb Saleh as Naadirah, Leo's girlfriend
 Robert Sheehan as Luba
 Gilbert Owuor as Maksim
 Jannis Niewöhner as Nicky Simsek
 Robert Kazinsky as Rob
 Noel Clarke as Stuart
 Dominic Monaghan as Oswald
 Mia-Sophie and Lea-Marie Bastin as Josie
 Florence Kasumba as Tanya
 Ulf Herman as Gunther
 Anja Karmanski as Kathy
 Sam Rockwell as Sam Bell (uncredited cameo)

Production
The film was in development hell for many years, but Jones always said he wished to direct it and has described it as a "spiritual sequel" to Moon, heavily inspired by the Ridley Scott film Blade Runner (1982). During the film's development, Jones had expressed his desire for Sam Rockwell to reprise his role from Moon in a cameo appearance that was to act as an epilogue for the character, and that the film would be the second instalment in a trilogy consisting of Moon, Mute and yet to be announced third film. In October 2016, Justin Theroux officially joined the cast, joining Skarsgård, Rudd, Noel Clarke and Florence Kasumba.

Filming
Filming began on September 28, 2016. The film was shot on site in Berlin by cinematographer Gary Shaw, who worked with Jones on Moon.

Music
Clint Mansell composed the film's score. In a series of Instagram posts titled Mute & Me, he cited the culture of 20th century Berlin as a major influence, claiming that "Berlin has been, and continues to be, a cultural hot bed of our times". Mansell drew from multiple forms of Berlin culture, including "poets and artists, musicians and philosophers, dreamers and drunks, lovers and the lost and lonely, the wild, the beautiful, and the damned". During background research for the film, Mansell claimed to have drawn inspiration from works of German expressionism such as Metropolis, the crime drama M, as well as works of classic and contemporary film noir like In A Lonely Place, Cape Fear, Chinatown, Brick, and Blood Simple.

Mansell also looked at the works of New German Cinema filmmakers like Werner Herzog, Rainer Werner Fassbinder, and Wim Wenders. He points to Fassbinder's World on a Wire as a specific sci-fi influence from that era. He also looked at the krautrock group Popul Vuh and their collaborations with Herzog on Aguirre, Wrath of God, and Nosferatu the Vampyre. Mansell cited Jones's father David Bowie's Berlin Trilogy of albums as being a major influence in terms of representing Berlin culture, along with other Brian Eno-produced albums like Ultravox!

Release
Originally scheduled for release in 2017, Mute was released on Netflix on 23 February 2018.

Marketing
The film was heavily promoted and discussed by Jones on Twitter with production stills and concept art. On 6 January 2017 three stills from the film were released, showing characters Leo, Cactus Bill, and Duck with the backdrop of a futuristic Berlin.

Critical response
The website's critical consensus reads, "Visually polished but narratively derivative and overall muddled, Mute is a would-be sci-fi epic whose title serves as an unfortunate guide to how it might be best enjoyed." On Metacritic, which uses a weighted average, the film received a weighted average score of 35 out of 100, based on 24 critics, indicating "generally unfavorable reviews."

References

External links
 
 
 
 
 

2010s mystery films
2010s science fiction films
British mystery films
British science fiction films
German-language Netflix original films
Films about disability
Male bisexuality in film
Cross-dressing in film
Films about bartenders
Films directed by Duncan Jones
Films scored by Clint Mansell
Films set in Berlin
Films set in the future
German mystery films
German science fiction films
English-language German films
English-language Netflix original films
Babelsberg Studio films
British neo-noir films
German neo-noir films
British multilingual films
German multilingual films
2018 multilingual films
Cyberpunk films
2010s English-language films
2010s British films
2010s German films